Sekiguchi (written: 関口) is a Japanese surname. Notable people with the surname include:

Fusao Sekiguchi Japanese industrialist 
Gen Sekiguchi Japanese film director 
Hisao Sekiguchi Japanese footballer
, Japanese skier
Kazuyuki Sekiguchi Japanese musician 
Kunimitsu Sekiguchi Japanese footballer
Mai Sekiguchi Japanese actress
Masakazu Sekiguchi Japanese politician 
Taro Sekiguchi Japanese motorcycle racer 
Yuhi Sekiguchi Japanese race driver 
The Sekiguchi Corporation invented the Monchhichi doll. 

Japanese-language surnames